Marino Acciabianca (died 1523) was a Roman Catholic prelate who served as Bishop of Nusco (1514–1523).

Biography
On 16 Dec 1513, Marino Acciabianca was appointed by Pope Leo X as Coadjutor Bishop of Nusco and succeeded to the bishopric in 1514.
He served as Bishop of Nusco until his resignation in 1523.

See also 
Catholic Church in Italy

References

External links and additional sources
 (for Chronology of Bishops) 
 (for Chronology of Bishops) 

16th-century Italian Roman Catholic bishops
1523 deaths
Bishops appointed by Pope Leo X